The Guntram and Irene Rinke Foundation is a German nonprofit organization based in Hamburg that awarded an annual literary prize for nostalgic literature.

Rinke prize winners

External links
  (in German)

German literary awards